Milling may refer to:
 Milling (minting), forming narrow ridges around the edge of a coin
 Milling (grinding), breaking solid materials into smaller pieces by grinding, crushing, or cutting in a mill
 Milling (machining), a process of using rotary cutters to remove material from a workpiece
 Milling (military training exercise), a type of boxing session in the British army
 Milling (surname), a surname
 Milling, a stage in Fulling, a woollen clothmaking process
 Milling, using milliradian marks to determine range
 Pavement milling, removing the surface of a paved area
 Photochemical machining, processes involved in photographic engraving and sheet metal manufacture

See also
 Mill (disambiguation)
 Miller (disambiguation)